William Messing is an American mathematician who works in the field of arithmetic algebraic geometry.

Messing received his doctorate in 1971 at Princeton University under the supervisions of Alexander Grothendieck (and Nicholas Katz) with his thesis entitled The Crystals Associated to Barsotti–Tate Groups: With Applications to Abelian Schemes. In 1972, he was a C.L.E. Moore instructor at Massachusetts Institute of Technology. He is currently a professor at the University of Minnesota (Minneapolis).

In his thesis, Messing elaborated on Grothendieck's 1970 lecture at the International Congress of Mathematicians in Nice on p-divisible groups (Barsotti–Tate groups) that are important in algebraic geometry in prime characteristic, which were introduced in the 1950s by Dieudonné in his study of Lie algebras over fields of finite characteristic. Messing worked together with Pierre Berthelot, Barry Mazur and Aise Johan de Jong.

Writings 
 Pierre Berthelot, Messing, Theorie de Dieudonné cristalline I, Journées de Geometrie Algebrique de Rennes, 1978, volume 1, pp. 17–37, Asterisque, volume 63, 1979
 Pierre Berthelot, Lawrence Breen, Messing, Theorie de Dieudonné cristalline II, Springer Lecture Notes in Mathematics, Volume 930, 1982
 With Berthelot, Theorie de Dieudonné cristalline III, in Paul Cartier and others, Grothendieck Festschrift, Volume 1, 1990, Springer, p. 173
 Barry Mazur, Messing, Universal extensions and one dimensional cristalline cohomology, Springer Lecture Notes in Mathematics, Volume 370, 1974
 Messing, The crystals associated to Barsotti–Tate groups: with applications to abelian schemes, Springer Lecture Notes in Mathematics, Volume 264, 1972

References 
The original article was a Google-aided translation of the corresponding article in German Wikipedia.

External links 
Homepage

Algebraic geometers
20th-century American mathematicians
21st-century American mathematicians
Living people
University of Minnesota faculty
Year of birth missing (living people)
Massachusetts Institute of Technology School of Science faculty